The Redwood River is a tributary of the Minnesota River,  long, in southwestern Minnesota in the United States. The river's name is believed to refer to the reddish bark of dogwood growing along streams in the region.

Course

It flows initially eastwardly as an intermittent stream, through Ruthton and into northwestern Murray County, then northwardly into Lyon County, where it turns northeastward and flows through Russell, Lynd, and Marshall.

Downstream of Marshall, the Redwood flows through a flat till plain and turns eastward into Redwood County, passing Vesta and Seaforth; sections of the river in this stretch have been straightened to form agricultural ditches. It flows into the Minnesota shortly downstream of the city.

A dam forming Redwood Lake in Redwood Falls was formerly used for hydroelectricity generation. It is presently maintained to preserve the lake for recreational use.

Approximately 82% of the land in the Redwood River watershed is used for agriculture, primarily for the cultivation of corn and soybeans. Hundreds of miles of streams in the watershed have been converted to agricultural ditches, disrupting habitat and reducing the ability of the land to absorb flooding.

Flow rate
The highest recorded flow during the period was 19,700 ft³/s (558 m³/s) on June 18, 1957. Readings of zero were recorded on numerous days in 1940 and 1959.

At an upstream gauge near Marshall, the annual mean flow between 1940 and 2005 was 69.5 ft³/s (2 m³/s). The highest recorded flow during the period was 6,380 ft³/s (181 m³/s) on May 9, 1993. Readings of zero were recorded on numerous days during several years.

See also
List of rivers in Minnesota

References

External links

Rivers of Minnesota
Tributaries of the Minnesota River
Rivers of Lyon County, Minnesota
Rivers of Murray County, Minnesota
Rivers of Pipestone County, Minnesota
Rivers of Redwood County, Minnesota